Chalford railway station was situated on the Great Western Railway's Golden Valley Line, between  and . It was just east of the bridge carrying Cowcombe Hill over the railway. To the east of the station site lies Chalford Viaduct, and beyond that, Sapperton Long Tunnel.

History
On 2 August 1897, a new station was opened at Chalford.

There were two platforms, a signal box, sidings and cattle pens. At one time there was also a shed for the steam railmotor.

In 1933, Chalford station issued 98,109 passenger tickets and 282 season tickets; it forwarded 7,632 parcels and 66 tons of general goods; goods received included 99 tons of coal and coke, 321 tons of other minerals, 305 tons of general goods; and the station handled 143 trucks of livestock.

Goods traffic ceased on 12 August 1963, and the station closed on 2 November 1964. The signal box remained in use until 13 June 1965.

Routes

References

External links
Chalford Station on navigable 1948 O.S. map

Stroud District
Disused railway stations in Gloucestershire
Former Great Western Railway stations
Railway stations in Great Britain opened in 1897
Railway stations in Great Britain closed in 1964
Beeching closures in England